France Football is a French weekly magazine containing football news from all over the world. It is considered to be one of the most reputable sports publications in Europe, mostly because of its photographic reports, in-depth and exclusive interviews and accurate statistics of the UEFA Champions League matches, and extensive coverage of the European leagues. The magazine was first published in 1946 and is headquartered in Paris. For more than six decades it has presented the Ballon d'Or award to the best football player of the year.

Awards
Between 1956 and 2009, France Football presented the best player in Europe with the Ballon d'Or ("Golden Ball"), often referred to as the European Footballer of the Year award. Following the award's merger with the FIFA World Player of the Year award in 2010, the magazine awarded the FIFA Ballon d'Or to the world's best player in partnership with FIFA, the sport's governing body, until 2016, when it resumed full ownership of the trophy. Since 1959, France Football also elects the French Player of the Year and awarded the best club team in Europe since 1968 to 1990.

Awards presented by France Football
 Ballon d'Or
 Ballon d'Or Féminin
 Kopa Trophy
 Yashin Trophy
 Gerd Müller Trophy
 French Player of the Year

In 2020, it also presented the Ballon d'Or Dream Team.

See also
L'Équipe
Onze Mondial
World Soccer (magazine)

References

External links

 Ballon d'Or - France Football 

France Football
1946 establishments in France
Biweekly magazines published in France
Magazines established in 1946